The first lady of East Timor (Portuguese: Primeira-dama de Timor-Leste) is the title attributed to the wife of the president of East Timor.

First ladies of East Timor

First ladies of East Timor during the War for Independence

First ladies of East Timor following the restoration of independence

References

East Timor
Politics of East Timor
East Timorese women in politics